The men's 440 yards hurdles event at the 1950 British Empire Games was held on 5 and 7 February at the Eden Park in Auckland, New Zealand.

Medalists

Results

Heats
Held on 5 February

Qualification: First 3 in each heat (Q) qualify directly for the semifinals.

Semifinals
Held on 7 February

Qualification: First 3 in each heat (Q) qualify directly for the final.

Final
Held on 7 February

References

Athletics at the 1950 British Empire Games
1950